Each 'region' has different Virtual Console titles available for download to the Wii, Nintendo 3DS, and Wii U depending on licensing and other factors.

Systems
Wii
List of Virtual Console games for Wii (Japan)
List of Virtual Console games for Wii (North America)
List of Virtual Console games for Wii (PAL region)
List of Virtual Console games for Wii (South Korea)

Nintendo 3DS
List of Virtual Console games for Nintendo 3DS (Japan)
List of Virtual Console games for Nintendo 3DS (North America)
List of Virtual Console games for Nintendo 3DS (PAL region)
List of Virtual Console games for Nintendo 3DS (South Korea)
List of Virtual Console games for Nintendo 3DS (Taiwan and Hong Kong)

Wii U
 List of Virtual Console games for Wii U (Japan)
 List of Virtual Console games for Wii U (North America)
 List of Virtual Console games for Wii U (PAL region)

See also
List of Wii games
List of WiiWare games
Wii Shop Channel
WiiWare
List of DSiWare games and applications

Nintendo-related lists
Video game lists by platform